













































Lists of country codes